Brazacorta is a municipality and town located in the province of Burgos, Castile and León, Region of Ribera, Spain. According to the 2007 census (INE), the municipality had a population of 75 inhabitants.

History 

There was a nuns monastery, founded by the Countess Ermesanda, the widow of Manrique Pérez de Lara. It is a villa recognized as a "pueblo solo" of the region of Aranda de Duero. Jurisdiction of the lordship made by the Coruña Count, who elected the mayor.

When the Antiguo Régimen ended, it was considered as a constitutional town with the same name, Aranda which belonged to the region of The Old Castile.
had 112 inhabitants at that moment.

Monuments 

Hermitage Cristo Humilladero
Assumption church (S.XIII)
Old laundries.

Events 

January 20 (Saint Sebastian)
June 24 (Saint John the Baptist)
August 15 (Nuestra Señora de la Asunción) This one is the most popular party.

References 

Municipalities in the Province of Burgos